This is a List of World Rally Championship broadcasters.

TV broadcasters

Notes

References

External links
 

World Rally Championship
broadcasters